Katayama Shinji (born September 6, 1979) is a former sumo wrestler from Yaizu, Shizuoka, Japan. His highest rank was maegashira 13.

Career
Katayama practised amateur sumo at Senshu University, finishing third at the All Japan Sumo Championships. He made his professional debut in March 2002 at the age of 22, joining Onomatsu stable. He did not have enough amateur titles to enter at the makushita level, instead beginning his career at the lowest level of sumo entry, maezumo. Nevertheless, he moved through the divisions quickly, reaching sekitori status upon promotion to the second highest jūryō division in July 2004.

Katayama was promoted to the top makuuchi division in May 2005. He earned eight wins against seven losses in that tournament, but did not manage to achieve kachi-koshi in the top division again. He could manage only a 7-8 score at the rank of jūryō 13 in March 2008, leaving him dangerously close to demotion to the unsalaried ranks. He maintained his sekitori status with a 9-6 mark in May 2008, but a disastrous 2-13 in July meant he was demoted to makushita for the September tournament. He retired in January 2009.

Unlike most sumo wrestlers, Katayama never adopted a traditional shikona, instead using his own surname as his fighting name. Other recent sekitori to use their own names include Shimotori, Satoyama, Kakizoe and Ichihara.

He was admired for the quality of his stamps during the pre-bout rituals, known as shiko, as he was able to raise his leg straight up in the air.

Fighting style
He was an oshi-sumo specialist who referred pushing and thrusting techniques. His most common winning kimarite was a straightforward oshidashi, or push out.

Career record

See also
Glossary of sumo terms
List of past sumo wrestlers

References

External links
 

1979 births
Living people
Japanese sumo wrestlers
Sumo people from Shizuoka Prefecture
Sumo wrestlers who use their birth name
People from Yaizu, Shizuoka
Senshu University alumni